"Oh My God" is the third single from A Tribe Called Quest's third album Midnight Marauders. The song contains a sample of "Who's Gonna Take the Weight" by Kool & the Gang. It also features Busta Rhymes on the chorus. Rolling Stone magazine included "Oh My God" on their list of 20 essential A Tribe Called Quest songs, noting "It's not easy to listen to Phife boast 'When's the last time you heard a funky diabetic?' now that the disease has taken his life. But that line also sounds fiercer and more defiant than ever."

Music video
The music video begins in a convenience store where Q-Tip and Phife Dawg are buying snacks. When they get outside, the video shoot's moving stage drives away with Ali on it. As Tip and Phife run after the truck, the kids gathered outside the convenience store chase them. After catching up with it and getting on, Tip begins to rap. There are three main scenes: a gate area, the group on the stage, and Busta Rhymes on the deli's roof. Near the end if the video, when Tip says, "Take off your boots 'cause you can't run the race", the children stop running.

Remixes and appearances
A remix of the song was featured on the limited edition of The Love Movement. The percussion on the remix was subsequently sampled and used for the percussion of the Jay-Z song "Dead Presidents".
Part of the song was re-recorded for the song "Intro-lude" on TLC's CrazySexyCool album.
The song was featured in the controversial 1995 film Kids.
The song appeared in the television series Black Lightning in the episode "The Book of War: Chapter Three: Liberation," when Khalil Payne, portrayed by Jordan Calloway, fought against Painkiller in his mind to take back control of himself.

Charts

Weekly charts

References

1994 singles
A Tribe Called Quest songs
Song recordings produced by Q-Tip (musician)
Songs written by Ali Shaheed Muhammad
Songs written by Phife Dawg
Songs written by Q-Tip (musician)
1993 songs
Jive Records singles